The 2019–20 Oklahoma Sooners basketball team represents the University of Oklahoma in the 2019–20 NCAA Division I men's basketball season. They are led by ninth-year head coach Lon Kruger and play their home games at the Lloyd Noble Center in Norman, Oklahoma as a member of the Big 12 Conference.

Previous season
The Sooners finished the 2018–19 season with an overall record of 20–14, 7–11 in Big 12 play to finish in a tie for seventh place. They lost in the First Round of the Big 12 tournament to West Virginia. They received an at-large bid to the NCAA tournament where they lost in the Second Round to Virginia.

Offseason

Departures

Incoming transfers

2019 recruiting class

2020 Recruiting class

Roster

Schedule and results

|-
!colspan=9 style=|Exhibition

|-
! colspan=9 style=|Regular season

|-
! colspan=9 style=| Big 12 Tournament
|- style="background:#bbbbbb"
| style="text-align:center"|Mar 12, 20208:00 pm, ESPN2
| style="text-align:center"| (3)
| vs. (6) No. 22 West VirginiaQuarterfinals
| colspan=2 rowspan=1 style="text-align:center"|Cancelled due to the COVID-19 pandemic
| style="text-align:center"|Sprint CenterKansas City, MO
|-

Source

Rankings

No coaches poll for week 1

References

Oklahoma
Oklahoma Sooners men's basketball seasons